Rosen's Brigade (shown on the loading screen without the apostrophe) is a horizontally scrolling shooter written by Ron Rosen for the Atari 8-bit family and published in 1983 by Gentry Software, a budget label of Datasoft. The player flies a fighter jet over a scrolling landscape, rescuing paratroopers falling from the top of the screen and shooting enemy air and ground vehicles. The back of the box frames the situation as a war, but there are no specifics.

This is one of two games from Datasoft where the designer's name is part of the title. The other is O'Riley's Mine by Mark Riley.

Gameplay
The player flies a fighter jet left and right over a horizontally scrolling landscape of desert terrain and water. Shooting and destroying all enemy forces ends the level. Initially the attackers are planes and helicopters, then tanks appear on the ground and ships in the water. Parachutists (the term used in the manual) fall from the top of the screen and can be rescued for points by flying over them. A mini-map shows the entire play area. Unlike similar scrolling shooters, such as Defender and its many clones, when the plane moves vertically it points in the direction of motion instead of remaining parallel to the ground.

Reception
A 1984 review in Video Games magazine concluded, "Although Rosen's Brigade isn't going to be an earthshaker, it's a fun game with rapidly increasing difficulty levels. And it is rather habit forming." Doug Stead, writing for ROM magazine, was enthusiastic about the controls and explosion effects, but found the scoring to be unbalanced. He wrote:

He also experienced some technical problems, such as the game slowing down and even locking up after a while.

See also
Other games by Ron Rosen:
Pacific Coast Highway
Mr. Robot and His Robot Factory

References

1983 video games
Atari 8-bit family games
Atari 8-bit family-only games
Horizontally scrolling shooters
Datasoft games